is an accomplished Japanese calligrapher, Zen teacher, author and translator of Buddhist texts from Japanese and Chinese to English, most notably works by Dogen (he began his translation of Shobogenzo in his twenties). He first met Shunryu Suzuki in 1964, and upon reading Suzuki's book Zen Mind, Beginner's Mind he stated, "I could see it's Shobogenzo in a very plain, simple language." He has helped notable Zen teachers author books on Zen Buddhism, such as John Daido Loori. A fellow of the World Academy of Art and Science—Tanahashi is also an environmentalist and peaceworker.

Gallery

Bibliography

References

Buddhist translators
Japanese calligraphers
Soto Zen Buddhists
Zen Buddhism writers
Japanese Zen Buddhists
Living people
1933 births